Agnes Inglis (1870–1952) was a Detroit, Michigan-born anarchist who became the primary architect of the Labadie Collection at the University of Michigan.

Early life
Agnes Inglis was born on December 3, 1870, in Detroit, Michigan, to Agnes (née Lambie) and Richard Inglis. Both of her parents were from Scotland. Her father was a doctor. She was the youngest child in a conservative, religious family, and educated at a Massachusetts girls' academy. Her father died in 1874, her sister died of cancer some time later, and her mother died in 1899 before Inglis was thirty years old.

After her mother's death, Inglis studied history and literature at the University of Michigan, receiving an allowance from her extended family. She left the university before graduating, and spent several years as a social worker at Chicago's Hull House, the Franklin Street Settlement House in Detroit, and the YWCA in Ann Arbor. While working in these settings, she became sympathetic to the condition of immigrant laborers in the United States, ultimately developing strong political convictions from the experiences.

In 1915 Inglis met and befriended Emma Goldman, and shortly thereafter, Goldman's lover and comrade Alexander Berkman. She increased her radical activities with the onset of World War I, and used much of her time and family's money for legal support, particularly during the Red Scare of 1919–1920.

The Labadie Collection
She befriended Joseph Labadie and in 1924 discovered the materials on radical movements he donated to University of Michigan in 1911 had hardly been cared for. The collection remained unprocessed, kept in a locked cage. She began volunteering full-time, carefully organizing and cataloguing what would be known as the Labadie Collection. Her contributions to the collection were unique. She used unorthodox methods of arranging the collection. On the catalog cards, personal opinions were sometimes added to the bibliographic information about the items.

After a few years, Inglis and Labadie sent letters to 400 radicals soliciting contributions on their personal experiences and organizing efforts. While the initial response was weak, over the next 28 years anarchists would donate an enormous volume of publications, writings, and documentary material to her collection. These include the papers of Roger Baldwin, Elizabeth Gurley Flynn, and Ralph Chaplin. She also helped many in their research and publications, such as Henry David with The Haymarket Tragedy and James J. Martin with Man Against the State. Inglis' work was known around the U.S., and after many anarchists died decades later, their families would donate their collections to the Labadie Collection. It is estimated that her efforts increased the size of the original collection by approximately twentyfold.

Death

Inglis died on January 30, 1952, in Michigan, leaving an expansive and comprehensive library on radical social movements. With her death, however, some of the nuances of the collection's organization were lost.

References

Avrich, Paul. Anarchist Voices: An Oral History of Anarchism In America. Princeton University Press, 1995. Princeton, NJ.
Jo Labadie and His Gift to Michigan, University of Michigan.
 Agnes Inglis Papers 1909 - 1952, Special Collections Library, University of Michigan.

External links
 

1870 births
1951 deaths
American anarchists
American librarians
American women librarians
Industrial Workers of the World members
University of Michigan alumni
American librarianship and human rights